Leopoldo Roberto Markovsky (born 29 August 1983 in São Paulo), known as Léo Paulista, is a Brazilian football striker, currently playing for Pattaya United.

Club career

Léo Paulista's career began with SE Palmeiras - his hometown team.  In 2002, he was loaned to Japanese club Yokohama F. Marinos. In 2004, he transferred to Londrina EC on loan for two seasons.  Returning to SE Palmeiras, he played out the 2006 season.  In the spring of 2007, he transferred to the São Paulo club CA Juventus, but within six months moved to CRB. In 2008, a further shift was made to another São Paulo club, Bragantino.  In June 2008, Leo trialled for second tier Polish club Górnik Zabrze. On 3 July 2008, he signed a two-year contract with the club.

However, his move to Poland was not successful, and after only 8 league games, Léo Paulista returned to East Asia.  In July 2009, he signed with Korean K-League club Daegu FC, joining them for the second half of the 2009 K-League season.  Léo Paulista layed an important part in improving the winning record of Daegu FC, the club having only won a single league game by the time Leo joined the team.  Léo Paulista would score 4 goals in 14 appearances in the 2009 K-League, and helped put together a four-game winning streak, which although not improving their final league position, at least ensured the team finished the season more positively than it seemed mid-season.

Léo Paulista,who was unattached after end of the contract with Daegu FC, moved to Volta Redonda in February 2011.

In January 2012, Léo Paulista signed a three and half-year contract with Tunisian club Étoile Sportive du Sahel.

References

External links 
 
 

Living people
1983 births
Brazilian footballers
Brazilian expatriate footballers
Sociedade Esportiva Palmeiras players
Yokohama F. Marinos players
Clube Atlético Juventus players
Clube de Regatas Brasil players
Londrina Esporte Clube players
Clube Atlético Bragantino players
Volta Redonda FC players
Górnik Zabrze players
Daegu FC players
J1 League players
Ekstraklasa players
K League 1 players
Brazilian expatriate sportspeople in South Korea
Expatriate footballers in South Korea
Brazilian people of Polish descent
Brazilian expatriate sportspeople in Poland
Expatriate footballers in Poland
Expatriate footballers in Japan
Association football forwards
Footballers from São Paulo